Kortavij or Kort Vij, also rendered as Gortavich, may refer to:
 Kortavij-e Olya
 Kortavij-e Sofla